The 2006 United States Shadow Senator election in the District of Columbia took place on November 7, 2006, to elect a shadow member to the United States Senate to represent the District of Columbia. The member was only recognized by the District of Columbia and not officially sworn or seated by the United States Senate.

Incumbent Shadow Senator Florence Pendleton ran for reelection, but was unable to make it onto the ballot as she had only 1,559 valid signatures, short of the necessary 2,000. The Democratic primary was won by Michael Brown, who went on to secure an easy victory in the November general election.

Primary elections
Party primaries took place on September 12, 2006.

Democratic primary

Candidates

On ballot
 Michael Donald Brown, political consultant
 Philip Pannell, political activist and community organizer

Failed to make ballot
 Florence Pendleton, incumbent Shadow Senator

Campaign
Brown's landslide victory was unexpected, and many attributed it to voters confusing Brown with the similarly named mayoral candidate Michael A. Brown, who was also on the ballot. Prior to winning the primary, Brown was a little-known political consultant who spent less than $1,000 on his campaign.

Pendleton, who was kicked off the ballot after Pannell challenged her signatures, ran a write-in campaign with little success. She also floated the idea of running as an independent in November, although ultimately that did not occur.

Results

General election
No Republican filed to run, and Brown's only opposition was Joyce Robinson-Paul of the D.C. Statehood Green Party. Brown cruised to victory, winning more than 84% of the vote.

Candidates
 Michael D. Brown (Democratic)
 Joyce Robinson-Paul (D.C. Statehood Green)

Results

References

United States Shadow Senator
2006